The Winchesters is an American dark fantasy drama television series developed by Robbie Thompson and is a spin-off of Supernatural (2005–2020). The series premiered on October 11, 2022, on The CW.

Synopsis
Set in the 1970s, Dean Winchester narrates the story of how his parents, John Winchester and Mary Campbell, met, fell in love, and fought monsters together while in search of their missing fathers.

Cast and characters

Main
 Meg Donnelly as Mary Campbell
 Drake Rodger as John Winchester
 Nida Khurshid as Latika Dar, a young hunter-in-training
 Jojo Fleites as Carlos Cervantez, a confident fighter against demons
 Demetria McKinney as Ada Monroe, a bookstore owner who takes interest in the occult
 Bianca Kajlich as Millie Winchester, John's mother

Recurring
 Jensen Ackles as Dean Winchester, John's and Mary's son (narrator)
 Gil McKinney as Henry Winchester, John's father 
 Tom Welling as Samuel Campbell, Mary's father
 Bridget Regan as Rockin' Roxy

Guest
Gil McKinney as Henry Winchester
Rob Benedict as Tango
Richard Speight Jr. as Loki
Ruth Connell as Rowena MacLeod
Jim Beaver as Bobby Singer
Alexander Calvert as Jack Kline

Production

Development 
On June 24, 2021, it was reported that a prequel series of Supernatural, titled The Winchesters that focuses on Sam and Dean's parents, John and Mary, was in development at The CW. The series is executive produced by Jensen Ackles, his wife Danneel Ackles (who portrayed Anael on the series), and Supernatural writer Robbie Thompson. Ackles also reprise his role as Dean Winchester as the narrator. A pilot order for the series was confirmed by The CW on February 3, 2022; the pilot was directed by Glen Winter.

On March 21, 2022, it was announced that Meg Donnelly and Drake Rodger were cast as Mary and John. On May 12, 2022, it was announced that The CW ordered it to series and premiered on October 11, 2022. In August 2022, it was confirmed that Ackles would reprise his role as Dean in a physical appearance in the first episode.

Filming 
Filming for the pilot episode began in April 2022 throughout New Orleans. Principal photography for the rest of the series began in New Orleans on July 25, and concluded on December 15.

Episodes

Reception

Critical response
On the review aggregator website Rotten Tomatoes, 100% of 8 critic reviews for The Winchesters are positive, with an average rating of 6.9/10. On Metacritic, it has a score of 49 out of 100 based on 6 critics, indicating "mixed or average reviews".

Ratings

The Winchesters had the most-watched series debut during the 2022–23 season for The CW. It was also the most-viewed premiere for the season.

References

External links 
 
 

2022 American television series debuts
2020s American drama television series
2020s American supernatural television series
Television series set in 1972
Television series by Wonderland Sound and Vision
Television series by Warner Bros. Television Studios
American prequel television series
American television spin-offs
Dark fantasy television series
Television series by CBS Studios
American fantasy drama television series
The CW original programming
Television shows filmed in New Orleans
Television shows set in New Orleans
Supernatural (American TV series)
Television series about families